Johanna Elisabeth von Staegemann (née Fischer; 11 April 1761, in Königsberg – 11 July 1835, in Berlin), was a German writer, painter, salonist and noble. She held one of the most famous salons of contemporary Germany in Königsberg and Berlin.

Life 
The daughter of the Prussian businessman, Kommerzienrat Johann Jakob Fischer (died 1786) and Regina nee Hartung (1734–1805) grew up in Königsberg, Prussia. 

In her liberal society, open to the arts and science, she gained a reputation as a young woman. She was known to Johann Friedrich Reichardt, Immanuel Kant and Theodor Gottlieb von Hippel, among others.  The writer and diplomat Friedrich Gentz and the poet Friedrich August Staegemann were among her admirers. 

In 1780 she married Justizrat Graun, son of the composer Carl Heinrich Graun. When her husband was called to Berlin in 1787, Elisabeth stayed with her two children and her mother alone in Königsberg for eight years. Towards the end of the 1780s, she established a salon-like social gathering and followed her husband to Berlin in 1795, but filed for divorce at the end of the year. 

A year later she married her aforementioned admirer Friedrich August Staegemann in Königsberg. In 1806 she returmed to Berlin again.

Due to the Prussian defeat in the battle of Jena and Auerstedt, the Staegemanns went back to East Prussia with the royal family. Here, she continued the operation of a salon. Their children became playmates for the princes and princesses. Friendly ties were also established with Prince Janusz Radziwiłł and his wife Luise von Prussia. 

After a three-year stay in Königsberg, the family returned to Berlin circa 1810. She intensified the operation of her salon there. As wife of the state councilor, Staegemann soon played a leading role in Berlin's cultural life, especially since her friend Rahel Varnhagen's salon was dissolved in 1806, leaving a social vacuum.

In the late 1820s, Staegemann stopped participating in the salon due to illness. Her (now married) daughter Hedwig von Olfers took her place as hostess. Since her time as Salonnière, she wrote and painted sporadically, including some self-portraits; but she saw herself as an amateur all her life. She died in Berlin in 1835. Her husband dedicated the Memories of Elisabeth to her, a collection of sonnets that he had written for her since the beginning of their relationship. Her grave is located in Kreuzberg. She rests there next to her second husband and their granddaughter Marie von Olfers.

Family 
Elisabeth Fischer married Ferdinand Graun on July 26, 1780, divorcing in 1795. They had two children, Ferdinand Graun and Antonie Theodora Graun.

In September 1796, she married Friedrich August von Staegemann (1763-1840), who, in 1816 by King Friedrich Wilhelm III, was made a member of the  Prussian nobility. Their children were  August von Staegemann (1797–1866)  and Hedwig von Staegemann (1799–1891).

Elisabeth von Staegemann founded a Salonnière dynasty through her daughter from Hedwig, which her granddaughter Marie von Olfers (1826–1924) continued. Her great-granddaughter was Sibylle von Olfers.

Salon 
The Salon of Elisabeth Staegemann, they since about 1810 free every day (sometimes Wednesdays) only in the Hunter Street, then called together (since 1818) in the Charlotte Street 68, on Dönhoffplatz (from 1825) and finally in the Charlotte Street 31 (since 1831), 

Historically, the salon stands between the enlightenment and romanticism periods. As with many other contemporary salons, the relative freedom from class barriers in the selection of guests and their mutual interaction is sociologically significant. Staegemann's own artistic talents also gave the salon special access to poetry and music. Writers like Clemens Brentano and Achim von Arnim presented their works here. Numerous statesmen and military men of the Prussian reform period also attended.

Notable habitués

Works 
 Memories for Noble Women (Erinnerungen für edle Frauen). 2 volumes, Leipzig 1858.

References

 Margarete von Olfers: Elisabeth von Staegemann. Lebensbild einer deutschen Frau 1761–1835. Köhler & Amelang, Leipzig 1937.

1761 births
1835 deaths
18th-century Prussian people
German salon-holders